Detective K: Secret of the Living Dead is a 2018 South Korean action adventure comedy film directed by Kim Sok-yun, starring Kim Myung-min, Oh Dal-su, Kim Ji-won and Kim Bum.

Plot
Set in the 18th century Joseon, at the period of time where complicated political situation exists under King Jeongjo, Kim Min (famously known as Detective K) and Seo-pil team up with a beautiful vampire who has amnesia, and they discover vampire bite marks on bodies. As they investigate further, they begin to realize that the vampire is somehow closely connected to the deaths.
When the truth was revealed, it is known that the beautiful vampire was once a human, specifically is the Crown Princess of the past Crown Prince. The Crown Prince was murdered during a revolt set by a group of traitor which involved Kim Min's father. In order to cover up their treason, the put the blame on the Crown Prince's loyal henchman, Jeong In-yul (Lee Min-ki) and his father. He swore to take revenge on the traitors by killing their precious persons.

Cast
 Kim Myung-min as Detective K / Kim Min 
Son of Premier Kim Shin in Joseon. He was exiled from the country for being insolent to the current King while being drunk and became a detective. He is extremely arrogant and like to brags about himself.
 Oh Dal-su as Seo-pil 
Kim Min's loyal friend and servant who joined him in his journey.
 Kim Ji-won as Wol-young
A beautiful vampire who was awaken from her 'slumber' by a mysterious monk. She lost her memories and team up with Kim Min to gain her memory. It turns out that she was the Crown Princess of Joseon. In a revolt in which the Crown Prince died, she and the young prince fled the Ganghwan Building with the help of Jeong In-yul. She was bitten by a vampire and burned alive after hiding her prince in a forest. It turns out that the monk that revived her 30 years later is her prince, Sun.
 Kim Bum as Cheon-moo
Kim Shin's general who was ordered to kill the prince of the former Crown Prince, Wang Sun and retrieve the proof of the treason committed 30 years ago.
 Park Geun-hyung as Kim Shin
 Woo Hyun as Mr. Bang
 Yoon Sang-hoon as Kim Shin (young)
 Jang Yool as Choi Jae-kyung
 Kim Jung-hwa as Choi Jae-hee
 Lee Min-ki as Jeong In-yul
Crown Prince's loyal henchman who was wrongly accused of being the head of the treason that causes the Crown Prince's death. While hiding with the Crown Princess, the young prince and his best friend Kim Shin, he was attacked by a vampire hiding in the abandoned ship. He died when Kim Shin set the ship on fire and flee, but was revived to life when his tomb was discovered after the fall of Ganghwan Building, which is being reconstructed.
 Hyun Woo as Crown Prince
An ambitious Crown Prince who planned to 'return' Joseon to its owner, the folk when he become the king. The loving husband of Wol-young and father of a young prince. He died due to being poisoned in a revolt cause by a group of traitor.
 Ahn Nae-sang as Bang Hyo-In
He is the leader and mastermind behind the treason which causes the Crown Prince's death. With young Kim Min is unconscious from his illness, he used it to threaten Kim Shin into betraying the Crown Prince and his best friend, Jeong In-yul.
 Nam Seong-jin as the current King of Joseon (special appearance)

Critical response
Yoon Min-sik of The Korea Herald reviewed the film as "formulaic, funny, but not super-fun"; calling the action and CG is weak and the writing to be "clumsy". However, Kim and Oh's chemistry was praised.

References

External links

Detective K: Secret of the Living Dead at Naver Movies 

2018 films
South Korean sequel films
South Korean action comedy films
South Korean crime comedy films
South Korean historical adventure films
Films based on South Korean novels
2010s adventure comedy films
2010s crime comedy films
South Korean detective films
Showbox films
2010s historical adventure films
2018 action comedy films
2010s South Korean films